Golam Mostafa Ahmed (died 19 December 2017) was a Bangladeshi politician and the incumbent Member of Parliament from Gaibandha-1.

Career
Ahmed was elected to Parliament from Gaibandha-1 in March 2017 in a by-election as a Bangladesh Awami League candidate. The by-elections were called after the incumbent Manjurul Islam Liton was assassinated.

Death
Ahmed was injured on 18 November 2017 in a road accident in Delduar Upazila, Tangail. He died from his injuries on 19 December 2017 in Combined Military Hospital, Dhaka.

References

2017 deaths
10th Jatiya Sangsad members
Awami League politicians
Road incident deaths in Bangladesh
Year of birth missing
Place of birth missing